Badu 'e Carros, is a high security jailhouse in Nuoro, Sardinia, Italy. It was opened in the 1970s and is located on the outskirts of the town. The jailhouse is mostly used for special kinds of prisoners like terrorists, highly dangerous mobsters and members of Cosa Nostra, Camorra or 'Ndrangheta. As of 31 October 2022, 246 people are serving time there.

Notable inmates
Luciano Leggio
Renato Vallanzasca
Francis Turatello
Antonio Iovine
Pasquale Barra
Attilio Cubeddu
Mullah Krekar
Graziano Mesina

See also
Article 41-bis prison regime
Brigate Rosse

References

Prisons in Italy